"Live on Letterman" was an online concert series webcast by CBS and Vevo. The concerts were filmed live in the Ed Sullivan Theater, the home of Late Show with David Letterman, and streamed on the CBS website. Despite the title, these concerts usually were not actually broadcast on Late Show with David Letterman.

History
The concert series first started in the year 2010.  It ended in 2015, when Letterman ended his 22 year run as host of Late Show.

Past performers

 Adele
 Alicia Keys
 Band of Horses
 Beady Eye
 Ben Harper
 Bon Jovi
 Brad Paisley
 Broken Bells
 CAKE
 Carrie Underwood - Record for most viewed live show
 Coldplay
 Depeche Mode
 Dierks Bentley
 Elvis Costello
 Florence + The Machine
 Franz Ferdinand
 Foster The People
 Foo Fighters
 Incubus
 Katy Perry
 KISS
 Glen Hansard
 Gorillaz
 J. Cole
 Jason Aldean
 Jennifer Hudson
 John Legend
 John Mayer (twice)
 Kings of Leon
 Lady Antebellum
 Lorde
 Maroon 5
 MGMT
 Mumford and Sons
 My Morning Jacket
 Norah Jones
 Passion Pit
 Pearl Jam - First official Live on Letterman
 Peter Gabriel
 Phish
 Phoenix
 Pitbull
 Queens of the Stone Age
 Ray LaMontagne
 Ryan Adams
 Sheryl Crow
 Silversun Pickups
 Snow Patrol
 St. Vincent
 Taylor Swift
 The Avett Brothers
 The Band Perry
 The Gaslight Anthem
 The Killers
 The Neighbourhood
 The Shins
 The Script
 The Temper Trap
 The Wanted
 Train
 TV on the Radio
 Two Door Cinema Club
 Wilco

References

External links
 

Concerts in the United States
David Letterman